Gummow may refer to
Gummow (surname)
Gummow's Shop, a hamlet in Cornwall, England
C.R. Gummow Public School, a school in Cobourg, Ontario, Canada